Bedevostan may refer to:
 Bedevostan-e Gharbi Rural District
 Bedevostan-e Sharqi Rural District